Aivar Sõerd (born 22 November 1964 in Haapsalu) is an Estonian politician and civil servant. He is a member of Estonian Reform Party.

He has been a member of XII, XIII and XIV Riigikogu.

References

Living people
1964 births
Estonian Reform Party politicians
Estonian civil servants
Members of the Riigikogu, 2011–2015
Members of the Riigikogu, 2015–2019
Members of the Riigikogu, 2019–2023
Members of the Riigikogu, 2023–2027
University of Tartu alumni
Recipients of the Order of the White Star, 4th Class
People from Haapsalu